The 1948 North Carolina gubernatorial election was held on November 2, 1948. Democratic nominee W. Kerr Scott defeated Republican nominee George M. Pritchard with 73.16% of the vote.

Primary elections
Primary elections were held on May 29, 1948.

Democratic primary

Candidates
W. Kerr Scott, former North Carolina Commissioner of Agriculture
Charles M. Johnson, North Carolina State Treasurer
R. Mayne Albright
Oscar G. Barker
W.F. Stanley 
Olla Ray Boyd

Results

General election

Candidates
Major party candidates
W. Kerr Scott, Democratic
George M. Pritchard, Republican

Other candidates
Mary Price, Progressive

Results

References

1948
North Carolina
Gubernatorial
North Carolina gubernatorial election